Cayley Spivey is an American indie rock, pop punk, and indie pop guitarist and singer-songwriter from Myrtle Beach, South Carolina. She began her career performing as a solo project known as Small Talks, recording and touring as a three-piece band. Under the Small Talks name, Spivey released the EP Until It Turns to Petals in 2017. The project's first full-length studio album A Conversation Between Us was released on February 1, 2019, via Common Ground Records.

In August 2020, Spivey announced she would be releasing new music full time under her own name and retiring the Small Talks moniker. In conjunction with that announcement, Spivey released "SFU", her first single using her given name.

Career 
Cayley Spivey began writing acoustic songs in her bedroom by the age of 15, and soon began booking local shows at coffee shops in  her native Myrtle Beach, S.C.

As Small Talks (2015-2019) 
Originally formed as a three-piece band on May 31, 2015, to perform her songs live, Spivey created the solo project Small Talks and played a number of club and house shows around Myrtle Beach, developing a strong local following.

In January 2017, the band was signed to California-based label Common Ground Records and released her debut EP Until It Turns To Petals, featuring the singles "New Dork Pity" and "Cop Car". That same year, the band was named co-winners of the "Skullcandy StayLoud Showdown" at the Knitting Factory in Williamsburg, Brooklyn, headlined by Canadian band July Talk, earning themselves ten dates on the 2017 Van's Warped Tour.

Over a number of months on tour, the backing members of the band left for a variety of personal reasons, leaving Small Talks as a solo project for Spivey. As a solo musician performing under the existing band name, Spivey released her full-length debut recording A Conversation Between Us on February 1, 2019, produced by Eli Strobeck. The album, an LP with more pop influence than  her indie-styled debut EP, spun the singles "Oceans", "Quiet Sounds", and “Nicotine & Tangerines”.

The band has toured extensively, opening for a variety of acts including Can't Swim, Broadside, With Confidence, Chaos Chaos, The Regrettes, and Shortly, as well as headlining their own dates and performing at festivals such as Bled Fest in Howell, Michigan, and The Fest in Gainesville, Florida.

As Cayley Spivey (2020-present) 
On August 5, 2020, Spivey announced that she would be releasing music for the first time under her given name, and retiring the Small Talks moniker for good. The move was to lean more into pop music over indie rock, and to increase her chances at success. "Since the project Small Talks has always been me," she explains, "I realized it’s not going to help if I’m constantly mistaken for a band."

At midnight Eastern Time on August 14, 2020, Spivey released her first single under her own name, entitled "SFU," meaning "so fucked up."

According to Spivey, the single "is an anthem for being trapped in a less than ideal situation through the lens of a hopeless romantic. I have a habit of romanticizing things that aren’t good for me whenever I’m not ready to let it go. This is me sharing my story of being stuck in a loop until I could see clearly enough to remove love’s blinders and walk away. Love can make me do crazy things, this song was my way of reflecting on why that is."

On October 26, 2020, Spivey released  her second single under her own name, "Not Over You Yet". Her third single, "Cross The Line", was released on March 19, 2021. The singles "Bad For Each Other", "Ordinary" (feat. DazyFace), and "Backseat Boyfriend" were released during the winter of 2021 and 2022.

Personal life 
Spivey identifies as non-binary, and uses any pronouns. She also identifies as pansexual, and refers to her sexuality – as well as her gender – as an integral piece of her sound, stating "a lot of my songs are inspired by relationships that I've had, and that comes from me being LGBTQ."
She has embraced viral social media video app TikTok both as a music artist and as an LGBTQ performer, garnering 164,000 followers in her first year on the platform and increasing to 275,000 by spring 2021.

Accompanying band 
Current members

 Cayley Spivey – vocals, guitar
 Emma Oakley – guitar
 Doug Smith – bass
 Tom LeBeau – drums

Past members

 Justin Charette – drums
Tyler Lankford – bass
 Kenny Kelly – bass
 Blake Byrd – drums

Discography 
Singles
 "New Dork Pity" (2017) (as Small Talks)
"Cop Car" (2017) (as Small Talks)
"Oceans" (2019) (as Small Talks)
"Quiet Sounds" (2019) (as Small Talks)
"Nicotine & Tangerines" (2019) (as Small Talks)
"SFU" (2020)
 "Not Over You Yet" (2020)
 "Cross The Line" (2021)
 "Bad For Each Other" (2021)
 "Ordinary" (feat. DazyFace) (2021)
 "Backseat Boyfriend" (2022)

Studio albums
 A Conversation Between Us (2019) (as Small Talks)

EPs
 Until It Turns To Petals (2017) (as Small Talks)
 Quiet Sounds (2018) (as Small Talks)

References 

Living people
American indie rock musicians
American rock guitarists
American pop guitarists
People from Ellicott City, Maryland
1998 births
Non-binary singers
Non-binary songwriters
American LGBT singers
American LGBT songwriters
Musicians from South Carolina
LGBT people from South Carolina
People from Myrtle Beach, South Carolina
Pansexual musicians
20th-century American LGBT people
21st-century American LGBT people
Pansexual non-binary people